Youth Attack! is a studio album by powerviolence/thrashcore band Charles Bronson. The album was originally released on 12" vinyl on Lengua Armada Discos in 1997. Its fourth pressing was later released in August 1999 as a Dutch version on 10" vinyl as opposed to 12".

Track listing

Sources
  Contains track listing, record label and pressing information

1997 albums
Charles Bronson (band) albums